Grylloblattella sayanensis is a species of insect in the family Grylloblattidae found in the Sayan Mountains of Russia. Its type locality is Sambyl Pass in Siberian Russia.

References

Grylloblattidae
Insects of Russia